Abeh-ye Hajji Nabi Gol Cheshmeh (also Romanized as Ābeh-ye Ḩājjī Nabī Gol Cheshmeh; also known as Gol Cheshmeh and Gol Cheshmeh-ye Ḩājjī Nabī) is a village in Nezamabad Rural District, in the Central District of Azadshahr County, Golestan Province, Iran. At the 2006 census, its population was 1,278, in 292 families.

See also 

 List of cities, towns and villages in Golestan Province

References 

Populated places in Azadshahr County